The 1979–80 North Carolina Tar Heels men's basketball team represented the University of North Carolina at Chapel Hill during the 1979–80 college basketball season.

Schedule

References

North Carolina Tar Heels men's basketball seasons
North Carolina
North Carolina
Tar
Tar